Hellman, Haas & Co was one of the first grocers in early Los Angeles, a partnership of Abraham Haas and Herman W. Hellman), and the predecessor company of Smart & Final. Located in the 1880s and 1890s at 218-224 (now 318-324) N. Los Angeles Street, immediately south of Mellus Row. This was the heart of the city's business district in the 1870s and 1880s. The store sold "everything from drugs to explosives." Food staples were sold by weight, in bulk. The store was one of seven names in the city's first phone directory. In the 1880s, Herman Baruch, who was married to Abraham Haas' niece, Jeanette Meertief, and his brother, Jacob Baruch, who was married to another niece, Jeanette Weiler, bought out Herman Hellman when Hellman took the position of manager of the Farmers and Merchants Bank, a bank which grew out of Hellman's being so trusted that early Angelenos entrusted their valuables to him for safekeeping. In 1889, the company name was changed to Haas, Baruch & Co., and by the turn of the 20th century the store was the growing city’s most dominant wholesale grocery business.

References

Supermarkets based in California
Wholesalers of the United States
Buildings and structures in Downtown Los Angeles
Hellman family